Andre Wakefield (born January 1, 1955) is a retired American professional basketball player. He was a 6'2½" (189 cm) 175 lb (79 kg) guard.  Born in Chicago, Illinois, he played high school  basketball at Crane High School and collegiately at the College of Southern Idaho and Loyola University Chicago. He played briefly in the NBA from 1978 to 1980.

NBA

Wakefield was selected with the 19th pick in the 5th round of the 1978 NBA Draft by the Phoenix Suns. In two seasons with Detroit Pistons, Chicago Bulls and Utah Jazz, he averaged 2.3 points, 1.0 rebounds and 0.9 assists per game. After his playing days, he became an assistant coach at Loyola.

Notes

External links
NBA stats @ basketballreference.com

1955 births
Living people
20th-century African-American sportspeople
21st-century African-American people
African-American basketball coaches
African-American basketball players
American men's basketball players
Anchorage Northern Knights players
Basketball players from Chicago
Billings Volcanos players
Chicago Bulls players
Detroit Pistons players
Loyola Ramblers men's basketball players
Phoenix Suns draft picks
Shooting guards
Southern Idaho Golden Eagles men's basketball players
Utah Jazz players